Schuylkill County (Pennsylvania Dutch: Schulkill Kaundi) is  a county in the Commonwealth of Pennsylvania. It is located in the heart of Pennsylvania's Coal Region and is part of Northeastern Pennsylvania. As of the 2020 census, the population was 143,049. The county seat is Pottsville. 

The county was created on March 1, 1811, from parts of Berks and Northampton counties and named for the Schuylkill River, which originates in the county. On March 3, 1818, additional territory in its northeast was added from Columbia and Luzerne counties. The county is part of the Pottsville, Pennsylvania Micropolitan Statistical Area.

History

18th century
The lands that today constitute Schuylkill County were acquired by William Penn's proprietors by treaty executed August 22, 1749, with representatives of the Six Nations and the Delaware, Shamokin and Shawnee, who received 500 pounds "lawful money of Pennsylvania". The territory described included all of Schuylkill County except the northern part of Union Township, which was included in the purchase of 1768.

In the year 1754, the area that would become Schuylkill County along with the areas that today are Berks, Dauphin, Lebanon, and Lehigh counties were settled by German immigrants. The earliest settlers in southeastern Schuylkill County, which was then part of Northampton County, were primarily Moravian missionaries from Saxony. Other early settlers in southern Schuylkill County were German Palatines.

An early mill in the county was built in 1744 by John Finscher, but it later burned down. The first log church in the county was built in 1755. Native American massacres were commonplace in Schuylkill County between 1755 and 1765. Warrant for tracts of land in the vicinity of McKeansburg were in existence as early as 1750. Found by Sammy Hepler in 1789.

Anthracite coal (then called stone coal) was discovered by Necho Allen near the area where Pottsville was ultimately developed in 1790.  In 1795, a blacksmith in Schuylkill County named Whetstone learned how to use the coal successfully for smithing purposes. In 1806 coal was found while the tail-race was cut of the Valley (Iron) Forge, on the Schuylkill. Daniel Berlin, another blacksmith, also used it successfully, and smiths in the neighborhood adopted using the coal.

19th century

 

Schuylkill County was created via an Act of Assembly on March 1, 1811, from portions of Berks and Northampton counties. More land was added to the county in 1818, from Columbia and Luzerne counties. At the time of its creation, the county had a population of about 6,000.  An early book of Schuylkill County history was written by Daniel Deibert in 1802.

Orwisgsburg was the first community in Schuylkill County to be laid out. During the early years of Schuylkill County, there was an attempt to make McKeansburg the county seat; Orwigsburg was also a contender. Orwigsburg was agreed upon to be the county seat, as it was deemed to be well-suited for industries.  Beginning in 1831, sentiment began to rise for moving the county seat to Pottsville. In 1846, the Legislature passed an Act that was approved by Governor Francis R. Shunk on March 13, submitting the question to the voters. The change was desired principally because the railroad and canal connections with Orwigsburg were problematic to transport the public to that town without losing valuable time while Pottsville had such facilities and was within easy access from all parts of the county.

In 1812, George Shoemaker who, with Necho Allen, had discovered "stone coal" at Centerville in Schuylkill County, personally delivered some coal to Philadelphia.  He gave away most of the coal, intending to encourage individuals to find ways to use it. Most of the experiments failed and though Shoemaker was nearly run out of town and called an "imposter", Mellon and Bishop of Delaware County successfully used it in their rolling mill. When other rolling mills also adopted the fuel, a large industrial market and demand developed.

The Schuylkill Navigation Company was chartered in 1815 to build a series of navigation improvements in the Schuylkill River. This was during a period when the much larger Erie Canal along the Mohawk River in New York also was being developed. It was well ahead of other key canals fueling the Industrial Revolution, such as the Delaware and Hudson, the Lehigh, the Chesapeake and Ohio, Delaware and Raritan, and Morris canals. The originators of the project did not count upon the coal trade to promote the success of the undertaking. They looked forward mainly to transporting the agricultural products being produced below the mountains, the lumber of Schuylkill County, and the grain and other products of the counties between the Susquehanna and Schuylkill rivers. The first shipments of coal by canal were made in 1822 when 1,480 tons were sent down the line.

With a regular supply of anthracite coal ensured, the southern anthracite coal field in Schuylkill County attracted speculators and fortune hunters. They were inspired by dreams of becoming millionaires. This was the first speculative era of the Schuylkill coal trade. Pottsville became the center of the movement. The more successful explorers revealed numerous veins of coal, extending over a vast stretch of county and with a seemingly inexhaustible quantity of coal. These discoveries brought excitement and speculation; lands were bought (and sold); roads were laid out in the forest, mines were opened and railroads projected, and innumerable town plots planned. The demand for houses was so great that the lumber for many was framed in Philadelphia and sent by canal to the burgeoning coal region.

At this stage, coal-mining firms were small and family owned. The residents and entrepreneurs of the Schuylkill region opposed the entry here of incorporated coal companies.  In these years, coal mining operations in the Schuylkill region were conducted with economy, and relatively little capital was required. As the workings were all above the water level, no machinery was required for water drainage or for hoisting coal to the surface. Coal breakers and other expensive fixtures and appliances for the preparation of coal had not then been introduced. Numerous operators produced from five to six thousand tons for market annually (which was then considered a respectable business), who had never committed thousands of dollars to their enterprises, including their first land purchases of coal mines. It was commonly asserted that coal land could be bought and mines opened for less capital than the purchase and stocking of a decent farm. Such mines could be worked for less capital than that required to establish a line of stagecoaches or transportation wagons.

Eventually, railroads replaced the canals as the primary means of transporting coal to markets.  Mining was taken over by major corporate business, especially after the Civil War. As a result, the Middle Coal Field was developed in the 1860s and the Philadelphia and Reading Railroad created a subsidiary (Philadelphia and Reading Coal and Iron Company) to buy or lease, and develop the expanding industrial coal trade.  Consumption of coal along the Schuylkill above Philadelphia in 1839 was 30,290 tons when the Pioneer at Pottsville, the first anthracite furnace in the United States, became operational. By 1849, consumption had increased to 239,290 tons, to 554,774 tons in 1859, and to 1,787,205 tons in 1873.

The numerous jobs in the mining industry comprised a catalyst for mass immigration to Schuylkill County from the British Isles and Europe in the 19th and 20th centuries.  As mines became more numerous (by 1846 there were 110 operators in the region and 142 collieries in Schuylkill County) and more complex (in 1846 there were 35 collieries below water level), mechanical breakers, steam locomotive, it became more labor-intensive both for accomplishing mining tasks and supporting mining's peripheral industries. Such industries included manufacturing of explosives, metal screens, pump components, piping, and timber for support. This led to an influx of population into Schuylkill and other anthracite counties to fill these jobs.  Beginning with the Irish immigration in the 1840s (fueled by the Great Famine), after the Civil War, beginning in the 1870s, newcomers arrived from Eastern Europe.  Poles, Hungarians, Lithuanians, Slovaks, Rusyns and Ukrainians (Ruthenians), often from the Austro-Hungarian monarchy settled in the villages of Schuylkill County and took their place among the laborers in the coal mines. By the 1880s and 1890s, thousands of Italians immigrated for jobs related to mining.

20th century

 
The anthracite mining industry peaked in production in 1917 and subsequently declined (with exceptions during the First and Second World Wars). In the 1950s and 1960s, underground mining operations closed in Schuylkill County and throughout the Coal Region and surface mining became predominate.

On November 5, 1934 (election eve), a parade marched through the Village of Kelayres in Kline Township. A crowd of Democratic Party supporters walked toward the home of Republican Party leader, Joseph Bruno. Frustration with Bruno family control of the school board and other local offices had been growing for years. Shots were fired from the Bruno home and yard located at Fourth and Centre Streets. Several people were killed and more than 20 marchers were injured.

In 2016, Schuylkill County had 6 underground mines and 25 surface mines operating, producing 62,000 tons and 833,000 tons of coal, respectively.  Operators today are re-mining areas of anthracite that were previously mined. It is estimated that 98 percent of the anthracite produced is from existing mines.

Renewable energy
Since the early 21st century, Schuylkill County has decreased its use of coal power and become a major producer of renewable energy. Twenty-five percent of the county's electrical production currently comes from renewable energy sources. Wind power is the largest producer, accounting for 80% of the renewable energy output, while solar and biomass account for 20%.

The Locust Ridge wind turbines in the north of the county produce enough electricity for 37,500 homes, equivalent to the 48 MW of electricity generated by the Wheelabrator Frackville's waste coal plant.

Railroad history

In the early 19th century, southern Schuylkill County was served by the Union Canal out of Pine Grove Township with connections west, and the Schuylkill Canal (the Schuylkill Navigation) southward from Port Carbon to Philadelphia. Coal mined by the Lehigh Coal & Navigation Company in the Tamaqua and Coaldale areas was often shipped down the Lehigh Canal from Jim Thorpe in neighboring Carbon County. To the north, mountain and ridges were a natural barrier to navigation. Other means were required to transport coal out of the rich basin of the Mahanoy Valley. Numerous railroads were begun in the late 1820s and early 1830s north of the Schuylkill Canal to enable the transport of coal to the canal terminus in Philadelphia and other markets. These included:
The Schuylkill Valley Railroad, commencing at Port Carbon to Tuscarora, a distance of ten miles, with fifteen branches intersecting it, the distances combined amounting to another ten miles. 
The Mill Creek Railroad, from Port Carbon up the valley of Mill Creek four miles, with about three miles of branch roads intersecting it. This was the first road completed and was in operation part of the year 1829.
The Mine Hill and Schuylkill Haven Railroad, commencing at Schuylkill Haven to Minersville having a length, including the west branch, of fifteen miles. There were also about five miles of branches intersecting it.
The Mount Carbon Railroad, commencing at Mount Carbon and extending up the east and west branches of the Norwegian creek; a length of road seven miles.
The Little Schuylkill Railroad, from Port Clinton to Tamaqua, twenty miles in length.

Of prime importance was the Mine Hill and Schuylkill Haven, which served the Schuylkill Canal. Chartered in 1831, tracks were laid from the flats in Schuylkill Haven along the river through Cressona and Minersville to Tremont. The railroad eventually reached Ashland and Locust Gap via the Gordon Planes.

Construction on the Little Schuylkill Railroad began in 1829. It ran from Port Clinton northward to Mahanoy Junction above Tamaqua. It would become the keystone of the Philadelphia and Reading system, serving as a gauntlet for its eastern and western branches. Connecting with it were four important lines. The 146 mile (235 km) Catawissa Railroad operated from Mahanoy Junction to West Milton, providing access to the Mahanoy region by joining the northern terminus of the Little Schuylkill with connections to New York City, Scranton and also points west. At Port Clinton, it connected with the P&R's main line from Mount Carbon. Its most important connection would be with the Mahanoy and Broad Mountain Railway via Mahanoy Tunnel and East Mahanoy Railroad.

There was once over 1,000 miles (1600 km) of railroad track in Schuylkill County. At one point in the 19th century, the largest railyard and roundhouse in the world was located at Mill Creek between Pottsville and St. Clair.

Farming history
Schuylkill County's history is not solely a story about coal mining and railroads. The first settlers were farmers or lumbermen. In the fertile agricultural valleys (not underlain with coal) between the Blue Mountain range in the south to near the Susquehanna River to the north, generations of farming families have helped feed their neighbors in the mines, on the rails, on the canals, and in the towns within and surrounding the county.  After settlement of the farms, came a period of diversified, small scale production that lasted until about the late 19th century. After then, more highly mechanized small farms combined livestock and crop production for new, mainly local and regional markets.  Then the system re-oriented to add orchard products, trees and plant products and poultry farming.  In 2012, the estimated value of agricultural products in Schuylkill County sold was $165,853,000, ranking 9th in the State and 704th in the US (counties). The county ranks in the top 100 in the US counties for nursery, greenhouse, floriculture, and sod products and cut Christmas trees and short rotation woody crops.

Textile industry history
Textile manufacturing evolved as a major industry in the county near the beginning of the 20th Century. Phillips & Jones Co. (Now known as Phillips Van Heusen), began in Pottsville, Pennsylvania, and was once Schuylkill County's largest employer.  Another textile giant, John E. Morgan Knitting Mills also began manufacturing in 1945 in Tamaqua, eventually becoming the largest employer in the county in the 1970-80s.  In addition there were numerous smaller shops all over the county, doing subcontract work for the major manufacturers all over the US. As the century wore on, textile industry, which employed significant numbers of women, rivaled the coal mining industry in importance, especially after the end of World War 2, when that industry began to collapse.  As a consequence of the Great Depression, garment manufacturers began to look for people willing to work (at lower wages) outside of New York City, the center of the industry.  Pennsylvania became the 3rd highest-ranked apparel manufacturer in the United States by 1940. Women's clothing became the state's fastest growing product.  The dominance of the industry in Schuylkill County lasted until the last decade of the 20th century, when it was clear that the garment manufacturing industry was leaving Schuylkill County and other regions of the US and moving to foreign countries.  By 2011, only six manufacturers employing 341 people remained in the county.

Geography

The Schuylkill River headwaters are found in the county, starting in the Appalachian Mountains, and flows through many towns and the city of Reading, Pennsylvania, to Philadelphia where it flows into the Delaware River. The Schuylkill drains the majority of the county while some western and northern areas of the county are drained by the Susquehanna River. The Swatara Creek, Wiconisco Creek, Mahantango Creek, Mahanoy Creek, and Catawissa Creek all start in Schuylkill County and are tributaries of the Susquehanna. Areas of the eastern portion of the county drain into the Lehigh River via the Quakake Creek, Nesquehoning Creek, Mahoning Creek, and Lizard Creek, all of which also start in the county. To the south, southern Schuylkill county is home to Blue Mountain and the Appalachian Trail. Broad Mountain crosses the county from northeast to southwest.

Schuylkill County is located in northeastern Pennsylvania's Coal Region. It is located just north of the Lehigh Valley and Reading metropolitan areas. Portions of eastern Schuylkill County around Tamaqua are located in the Pocono Mountains. As a result, like other portions of the Poconos, eastern Schuylkill has experienced an influx of people from New York City and New Jersey who commute into Manhattan each day. The commute can take up to two hours each way due to distance and traffic. Far western areas of the county are located near Harrisburg and are sometimes considered to be located in South Central Pennsylvania.

Climate
The county has a humid continental climate (Dfa/Dfb) with four distinct seasons. The hardiness zone is 6b in lowlands of the south-central and SW areas of the county. In the remainder of Schuylkill, the zone is 6a except in some higher areas to the NE on Broad Mountain where it is 5b. Broad Mountain separates the Susquehanna and Schuylkill watersheds for much of its length. Average monthly temperatures in the vicinity of downtown Pottsville range from 27.3 °F in January to 72.3 °F in July, while in Mahanoy City they range from 24.3 °F in January to 69.3 °F in July.

Adjacent counties
 Luzerne County (north)
 Carbon County (northeast)
 Lehigh County (southeast)
 Berks County (south)
 Lebanon County (southwest)
 Dauphin County (southwest)
 Northumberland County (northwest)
 Columbia County (northwest)

Major roads and highways

Demographics

2020 census

Micropolitan Statistical Area

The U.S. Office of Management and Budget has designated Schuylkill County as the Pottsville, PA micropolitan statistical area (µSA).  As of the 2010 U.S. Census the micropolitan area ranked the number 1 most populous in the State of Pennsylvania and the 5th most populous in the United States with a population of 148,289.

Law and government

The Schuylkill County Sheriff's Department consists of the Sheriff's Office and operates the Central Booking unit. The Sheriff's Office is composed of a Civil and Criminal Division.  The Civil Division processes real estate and property paperwork, as well as issue firearms permits.  The Criminal Division is responsible for the security of the courthouses, as well as the transportation of prisoners to and from court hearings and to other correctional facilities. The Sheriff's Department is also responsible for detecting and interdicting weapons before they can enter the courthouse and making criminal arrests of persons when weapons are found. The Sheriff's Department provides all facets of security for the County courthouse and makes arrests inside the courthouse for various offenses including possession of weapons and controlled substances as well as the arrest of disorderly persons and other violations of the Pennsylvania Crimes Code Title 18.  All Deputy Sheriffs are sworn law enforcement officers who must attend the state Sheriff Academy in State College to be certified as a Deputy Sheriff. The Sheriff Academy is a paramilitary Sheriff academy that consists of 6 months of intense training in all facets of criminal and civil law of Pennsylvania as well as physical training, self defense training, weapons certification and training, as well as tactical training, training in handcuffing and restraint, courtroom and courthouse security, and conducting security assessments of Courthouse and courtroom facilities. Central Booking processes fingerprints and photographs of arrested individuals. When requested by other police agencies, the Sheriff's Department performs patrol duties in various communities within Schuylkill county and provides support to other Police agencies during major incidents, search warrant executions, arrest warrant operations, special events and in various other capacities.

Politics 

|}

, there were 94,110 registered voters in Schuylkill County.

 Republican: 45,054 (47.87%)
 Democratic: 40,092 (42.60%)
 Other Parties: 8,964 (9.53%)

, there were 88,642 registered voters in Schuylkill County.

 Republican: 49,025 (55.31%)
 Democratic: 27,924 (31.50%)
 Independent: 7,508 (8.47%)
 Third Party: 4,185 (4.72%)

While the Republican Party has been historically dominant in Schuylkill County politics, Democrats became dominant at the county level after the 2007 elections. John McCain received 53.6% of the vote to 44.9% for Barack Obama in November 2008. In the state row offices of the same election, each statewide winner carried the county. In 2006 Democrat Tim Seip won the heavily Republican 125th House district and Bob Casey Jr. carried Schuylkill when he unseated incumbent Republican US Senator Rick Santorum. For many years, the county was represented in the United States House of Representatives by conservative Democrat Tim Holden of St. Clair. Former State Representative Dave Argall won the special election of March 3 to succeed the late State Senator Jim Rhoades and was sworn in on March 17. Jerry Knowles won the special election for Argall's seat in the 124th House district on May 19. In 2010, the GOP regained ground when Seip was defeated for reelection by Republican Mike Tobash. In 2011, the GOP reclaimed the county government.

This GOP resurgence has been followed by the subsequent election of Donald Trump in 2016, where he received 69% of the area's popular vote to Hillary Clinton's 26.7%. Trump received the highest percentage of the vote of any presidential candidate since 1964, when Lyndon B. Johnson won the county in his national landslide victory.

Commissioners
 Barron "Boots" Hetherington, chair, Republican
 George Halcovage, Republican
 Gary J. Hess, Democrat

Other county officials
 Clerk of Courts, Maria Casey, Republican 
 Controller, Sharyn Yackenchick (Acting), Republican
 Coroner, David J. Moylan, Republican
 District Attorney, Michael O'Pake, Democrat
 Prothonotary, Bridget McGowan Miller, Republican
 Recorder of Deeds, Ann Dudish, Republican
 Register of Wills, Theresa Santai-Gaffney, Republican
 Sheriff, Joseph Groody, Democrat
 Treasurer, Linda Marchalk, Republican

Pennsylvania House of Representatives
 Tim Twardzik, Republican, 123rd district
 Jerry Knowles, Republican, 124th district
 Joseph Kerwin, Republican, 125th district

Pennsylvania Senate
 Dave Argall, Republican, 29th district

United States House of Representatives
 Dan Meuser, Republican, 9th district

United States Senate
 [[John Fetterman Democratic Party, United States]
 Bob Casey Jr., Democrat

Education

Colleges and universities
 Alvernia University, Pottsville
 Lehigh Carbon Community College - Morgan Center, Tamaqua
 Penn State Schuylkill Campus, Schuylkill Haven

Public school districts

 Blue Mountain School District
 Hazleton Area School District (also in Luzerne and Carbon Counties)
 Mahanoy Area School District
 Minersville Area School District
 North Schuylkill School District (also in Columbia County)
 Panther Valley School District (also in Carbon County)
 Pine Grove Area School District
 Pottsville Area School District
 Saint Clair Area School District
 Schuylkill Haven Area School District
 Shenandoah Valley School District
 Tamaqua Area School District
 Tri-Valley School District
 Williams Valley School District (also in Dauphin County)

Communities

Under Pennsylvania law, there are four types of incorporated municipalities: cities, boroughs, townships, and, in at most two cases, towns. The following cities, boroughs and townships are located in Schuylkill County:

City
 Pottsville (county seat)

Boroughs

 Ashland (partly in Columbia County)
 Auburn
 Coaldale
 Cressona
 Deer Lake
 Frackville
 Gilberton
 Girardville
 Gordon
 Landingville
 Mahanoy City
 McAdoo
 Mechanicsville
 Middleport
 Minersville
 Mount Carbon
 New Philadelphia
 New Ringgold
 Orwigsburg
 Palo Alto
 Pine Grove
 Port Carbon
 Port Clinton
 Ringtown
 Schuylkill Haven
 Shenandoah
 St. Clair
 Tamaqua
 Tower City
 Tremont

Townships

 Barry
 Blythe
 Branch
 Butler
 Cass
 Delano
 East Brunswick
 East Norwegian
 East Union
 Eldred
 Foster
 Frailey
 Hegins
 Hubley
 Kline
 Mahanoy
 New Castle
 North Manheim
 North Union
 Norwegian
 Pine Grove
 Porter
 Reilly
 Rush
 Ryan
 Schuylkill
 South Manheim
 Tremont
 Union
 Upper Mahantongo
 Walker
 Washington
 Wayne
 West Brunswick
 West Mahanoy
 West Penn

Census-designated places
Census-designated places are unincorporated communities designated by the U.S. Census Bureau for the purposes of compiling demographic data. They are not actual jurisdictions under Pennsylvania law.

 Altamont
 Beurys Lake
 Branchdale
 Brandonville
 Buck Run
 Cumbola
 Delano
 Donaldson
 Duncott
 Englewood
 Forestville
 Fountain Springs
 Friedensburg
 Grier City
 Heckscherville
 Hegins
 Hometown
 Kelayres
 Klingerstown
 Lake Wynonah
 Lavelle
 Locustdale
 Marlin
 McKeansburg
 Morea
 Muir
 New Boston
 Newtown
 Nuremberg
 Oneida
 Orwin
 Park Crest
 Ravine
 Reinerton
 Renningers
 Seltzer
 Shenandoah Heights
 Sheppton
 Summit Station
 Tuscarora
 Valley View

Other unincorporated communities

 Adamsdale
 Aucheys
 Andreas
 Barnesville
 Beuchler
 Blackwood
 Boston Run
 Brockton
 Brommerstown
 Brookside
 Clamtown
 Connerton
 Drehersville
 Deturksville
 Exmoor
 Fearnot
 Frisbie
 Fountain
 Ginthers
 Glen Carbon
 Good Spring
 Haddock
 Hauto
 Hecla
 Irving
 Joliett
 Kepners
 Leibeyville
 Llewellyn
 Locust Valley
 Lofty
 Lorberry
 Mahoning Valley
 Mantzville
 Marstown
 Mary D
 Molino
 Moyers
 New Mines (located within Branchdale)
 Newkirk
 North Pine Grove
 Orwin
 Outwood
 Owl Creek
 Pitman
 Pleasant Valley
 Quakake
 Rauschs
 Reedsville
 Reevesdale
 Rene Mont
 Roedersville
 Rough and Ready
 Sacramento
 Seek
 Sheridan
 Snyders
 South Tamaqua
 Spring Glen
 Stanhope
 Steins
 Still Creek
 Stonemont
 Suedberg
 Tamanend
 Weishample
 Zenners
 Zion Grove

Population ranking
The population ranking of the following table is based on the 2010 census of Schuylkill County.

† county seat

Notable people
 Muhammad Ali, former heavyweight boxing champion, had his training camp in Deer Lake
 Charles Justin Bailey, former commanding general of the 81st Division in World War I
 Gary Becker, economist and University of Chicago professor awarded Nobel Prize in Economic Sciences
 Francis Brennan, Catholic Church cardinal
 Les Brown, former leader of Les Brown and the Band of Renown 
 Walter Ciszek, former Roman Catholic priest, author, and gulag survivor
 George Dietzler, American Civil War general
 Jimmy Dorsey, former jazz musician and band leader
 Tommy Dorsey, former jazz musician and band leader
 David Horst, former Major League Soccer player
 John E. Jones III, former U.S. federal judge
 George Joulwan, former Supreme Allied Commander, Europe
 Danny Litwhiler, former Major League Baseball player
 Molly Maguires, a clandestine society of Irish miners who engaged in a violent confrontation with Pennsylvania mining companies in the 19th century
 John O'Hara, short story writer and novelist 
 Henry Pleasants, coal mining engineer and Union Army brigadier general in the American Civil War
 Darryl Ponicsan, novelist
 Conrad Richter, Pulitzer-Prize and National Book Award-winning American novelist 
 Victor Schertzinger, musician, film director, and composer. 
 John Walson, cable television system pioneer

See also
 National Register of Historic Places listings in Schuylkill County, Pennsylvania
 Mahantongo
 Reading Company
 Yuengling

Notes

References

External links

 
 Schuylkill Chamber of Commerce
 Schuylkill County Visitors Bureau

 
1811 establishments in Pennsylvania
Anthracite Coal Region of Pennsylvania
Counties of Appalachia
Populated places established in 1811
Ukrainian communities in the United States